Zigzag of Success (translit. Zigzag udachi) is a 1968 Soviet comedy film directed by Eldar Ryazanov.

Plot
Photo studio "Contemporary" in a provincial town lives with its everyday problems. The director is concerned over the failure to fulfill the planned targets, receptionist Alevtina wants to get married, and photographer Vladimir Oreshnikov dreams of becoming a professional photographer.

But suddenly luck smiles on Oreshnikov. He takes 20 rubles form the worker's mutual aid fund, buys a government lottery bond and wins 10,000 rubles. Oreshnikov wants to receive the win himself, but his colleagues object to him, because the money that he spent on the bond were public, hence the win should be divided equally among all workers. It creates a controversial situation, which is successfully resolved on the very eve of the New Year, under the chiming clock  ...

Cast
 Yevgeny Leonov as Vladimir  Oreshnikov, photographer
 Irina Skobtseva as Lidia Sergeevna, photographer
 Valentina Talyzina as Alevtina Vasil'evna, receptionist in photo studio, the chairman of the trade union committee of photo studio
 Yevgeniy Yevstigneyev as Ivan Kalachev, director of carpool, Alevtina's bridegroom
 Alexey Gribov as  Kirill  Polotencev, director of photo studio
 Gotlib Roninson as  radiologist, Lidia Sergeevna's husband
 Georgi Burkov as Peter, photographer-retoucher, alcoholic
 Valentina Telichkina as  Olya, Oreshnikov's bride, cashier in bank
 Boris Suslov as Yura, photographer
 Svetlana Starikova as Irina, Yura's wife
 Antonina Dmitrieva as leading lottery
 Nina Sazonova as Maria Petrovna, Alevtina's mother
 Victor Shulgin as Alevtina's father
 Felix Javorski as chairman of the lottery commission
 Vladimir Gulyaev as policeman on lottery
 Ekaterina Savinova as oranges saleswoman

References

External links

1968 films
Mosfilm films
1968 comedy films
Soviet comedy films
Russian comedy films
Films scored by Andrey Petrov